Li Qiwan (September 1935 – 14 September 2022) was a Chinese politician. A member of the Chinese Communist Party, he served in the National People's Congress from 1983 to 1988.

Li died in Jinan on 14 September 2022.

References

1935 births
2022 deaths
Chinese Communist Party politicians
Delegates to the 6th National People's Congress
People from Penglai, Shandong